The White Devil (Italian: Il diavolo bianco) is a 1947 Italian historical adventure film directed by Nunzio Malasomma and starring Rossano Brazzi, Annette Bach and Roldano Lupi. It is based on Leo Tolstoy's 1912 novella Hadji Murat.

It was shot at the Scalera Studios in Rome. The film's sets were designed by the art director Arrigo Equini. It earned around 272 million lira at the Italian box office.

Synopsis
In the Caucasus a rebel fighter battles against the rule of an oppressive Russian Governor, although he is in real life a prince who pretends to be a supporter of the Governor.

Cast
 Rossano Brazzi as Prince André Mdwani - Il diavolo bianco
 Annette Bach as Countess Olga Kutezoff
 Roldano Lupi as Gov. Alexis Ignatieff
 Lea Padovani as Katiousha
 Harry Feist as Col. Stanikow
Mario Ferrari as Prof. Ilya
 Armando Francioli as Wassili
 Vittorio Sanipoli as John
 Vittorina Benvenuti as Elena
 Angelo Calabrese as Michailoff
 Mario Gallina as Stoloff
 Cesare Lancia as 	Fiodor
 Nino Marchetti as Captain Peter

References

Bibliography 
 Chiti, Roberto & Poppi, Roberto. Dizionario del cinema italiano: Dal 1945 al 1959. Gremese Editore, 1991.
 Goble, Alan. The Complete Index to Literary Sources in Film. Walter de Gruyter, 1999.

External links 
 

1947 films
Italian historical adventure films
1940s historical adventure films
1940s Italian-language films
Films directed by Nunzio Malasomma
Italian black-and-white films
Films shot at Scalera Studios
Films set in the 19th century
Films based on works by Leo Tolstoy
Films set in the Russian Empire
1940s Italian films